The Cleveland State Vikings men's tennis team represents Cleveland State University in NCAA Division I college tennis. The team belongs to the Horizon League and plays home matches at the Medical Mutual Tennis Pavilion. The Vikings are currently led by head coach Brian Etzkin. Cleveland State dropped tennis as a sport following the 1991–1992 school year. Tennis was brought back for the 1999–2000 school year.

Championships

Mid-Continent Conference Team Championships (0):
Horizon League Team Championships (7):
2008, 2009, 2010, 2011, 2013, 2018, 2019

Record by year

NCAA Tournament history

Head coaching history

References

External links
 

College men's tennis teams in the United States
Cleveland State Vikings